Anderson Island may refer to:

 Anderson Island (Tasmania), Australia
 An island in the Albany River, Northern Ontario, Canada
 Anderson Island (Andaman and Nicobar Islands), India
 Anderson Island (California), US
 Anderson Island (Washington), US

See also
 Little Anderson Island, Tasmania, Australia
 Andersson Island, Tabarin Peninsula, Antarctica